Thomas Salmon may refer to:

Thomas Salmon (musicologist) (1648–1706), English cleric and writer on music
Thomas Salmon (bishop) (1715?–1759), Anglican bishop in Ireland
Tom Salmon (priest) (1913–2013), Anglican Dean of Christ Church Cathedral, Dublin
Thomas P. Salmon (born 1932), Governor of the U.S. state of Vermont, 1973–1977
Thomas M. Salmon (born 1963), his son, Auditor of Accounts in the U.S. State of Vermont
Thomas Salmon (historian) (1679–1767), English historical and geographical writer
Thomas William Salmon (1876–1927), American physician and a leader of the mental hygiene movement